Coorparoo Football Club is an Australian rules football club based in the Brisbane suburb of Coorparoo. The institution was established in 1996, one year after the original Coorparoo club folded.

The club currently plays in the QFA Division 1, managed by the AFL Queensland. Apart from the Senior team, Coorparoo has also women's and youth football divisions.

History  
The club was founded in 1996 by Craig Dixon with the name "Treasury Kings FC". Dixon worked at Brisbane's Treasury Casino and was responsible for organising an annual "grudge" match of Australian rules football between the Brisbane Treasury Casino and Gold Coast's Jupiters Hotel and Casino.

In 1996, a number of players expressed interest in playing on a more regular basis, and with Craig's organising, the Kings were born. During the first couple of seasons the Kings competed in AFLSQ's Division 3 and played under the name –Treasury Kings– at Yeronga's home ground. In 1999, a move to the oval that was once the home of the historic and successful Coorparoo Roos and a promotion to Division 2, bought about the name change to the "Coorparoo Kings".

The Coorparoo Kings since have gone on to win senior premierships in the AFLQ State Association in 2000 and 2001, promoting to Division 1.

In 2010, the Coorparoo Kings, under the guidance of Brownlow medal vote getter Michael Gibson, moved themselves into the upper echelons of the competition. This plus the recruitment of Ben Gibson, who had decided to play under his father the previous season, and Byron Spurling, Sandy Hampson and numerous other outstanding players. Even the reserves looked strong with veteran players Joel Henderson, Michael Hewitt and Paul Hoskings coming together to form an experienced midfield group which allowed the Reserves coach James House to mould a team around.

The regular season saw both teams finish inside the top two and again both teams found themselves in the grand final, with both teams playing Caloundra. The reserves led by captain Joel Henderson, won a hard fought game, with Michael Hewitt somewhat controversially awarded the best on ground medal. It was later decided that the medal should be handed back to its rightful owner, James Gimblett. Others to play well were Dan Brown, his brother Taylor Browne (who was later awarded the best and fairest medal for the Kings reserves) Chris Frangos and Paul Hoskings.

Since the 2010 Season, Coorparoo have had significant success across both the Seniors & Reserves.

The Seniors have featured in the Division 1 Grand Final in 2010, 2011, 2012, 2013 as well as Grand Finals in the restructured QFA competition in 2015 & 2016, with 2011, 12, 13 & 2016 all bringing the silverware back to Giffin Park.

The Reserves have also carved out success over the past few years with Grand Final appearances in 2010, 2012, 2013 and 2016. The 2010, 2013 & 2016 teams managed to add to an already impressive trophy cabinet.

Statistics

See also
 Coorparoo Football Club

References

External links
 Official site

Coorparoo
Australian rules football clubs in Brisbane
1996 establishments in Australia
Australian rules football clubs established in 1996
Coorparoo, Queensland